The Biological Weapons Act 1974 (citation 1974 c.6) is an Act of the Parliament of the United Kingdom, passed during the reign of Queen Elizabeth II on 8 February 1974, with the long title "An Act to prohibit the development, production, acquisition and possession of certain biological agents and toxins and of biological weapons."

The Act makes illegal the development, production, acquisition or retainment of biological weapons, as well as any weapon delivery systems for the deployment of biological weapons. It also forbade the exchange between people of biological weapons and established the prison sentence for committing the crimes mentioned in the Act; a maximum sentence of life imprisonment.

The Act extends to anyone within the United Kingdom, or British citizens abroad, however the citizen must be within the United Kingdom, the Isle of Man or any of the British colonies to be arrested for the offense.

It also gives Customs and Excise officers the power to seize biological weapons coming in or out of the United Kingdom, or British citizens in other countries transporting biological weaponry for deportation to the UK.

A fourth section says that anyone may be charged (as with other crimes) with aiding and abetting or conspiring to transport biological weapons.

The Act extends to the entire United Kingdom.

United Kingdom Acts of Parliament 1974
United Kingdom military law
1974 in international relations
Biological warfare
United Kingdom biological weapons program